Bougouni Airport  is an airstrip serving Bougouni in Mali.

See also
Transport in Mali
List of airports in Mali

References

External links
 OurAirports - Mali
 Bougouni

 Google Earth

Airports in Mali